A pyridotriazolodiazepine is a heterocyclic compound containing pyridine and triazole rings fused to a diazepine ring.

Pyridotriazolodiazepines forms the central structure of zapizolam. Zapizolam is poorly researched, but probably it is a sedative and/or anxiolytic, like other benzodiazepine derivatives, especially triazolobenzodiazepines (such as alprazolam).

Pyridodiazepines